Farnumsville Historic District is a historic district encompassing a historic mill village  in Grafton, Massachusetts.  It is located on the eastern bank of the Blackstone River, extending along Providence and Main Streets, roughly between Cross and Depot Streets, and radiating along those roads and adjacent streets.  This area was one of Grafton's 19th century industrial mill villages, which was centered on the Farnum Mill, which first began operating in the second decade of the 19th century.  The main mill building that survives dates to 1844, and the housing stock in the village is in a diversity of styles, built roughly between the 1820s and 1920s.

The district was added to the National Register of Historic Places in 1996.

See also
National Register of Historic Places listings in Worcester County, Massachusetts
Fisherville Historic District

References

Historic districts in Worcester County, Massachusetts
Grafton, Massachusetts
National Register of Historic Places in Worcester County, Massachusetts
Historic districts on the National Register of Historic Places in Massachusetts